Joseph Zatrillas Vico, (Cagliari – Sardinia, 21 August 1648 – France 1720) was a poet, writer, and politician. He was born to a noble Sardinian family when the kingdom of Sardinia was part of the Spanish crown.

From 1688 to 1698 he was in Parliament of the Kingdom of Sardinia, in 1701 was named "Marquis de Villaclara" by Philip V of Spain but in 1706, but during the succession dispute, he was accused of treason by the Spanish Crown and forced into exile in Toulon.

He is the author of two works: 'Poema heroico' (heroic poem) dedicated to Mexican poet sister Juana Inés de la Cruz and the novel 'Engaños y desengaños del profano amor'.

Works 
 Poema heroico al merecido a/plauso del el unico Oraculo de/las/Musas, glorioso assombro de los Ingenios, y/Ce/lebre Phenix de la Poesia, la Esclarecida y Ve/ne/rable Señora, Suor Juana Ines de la Cruz Religiosa Professa en el Monasterio de San Geronimo de la Imperial Ciudad de Mexico , Barcelona, 1696
 Engaños y desengaños del amor profano, Napoles, 1687–88, duos tomos

Bibliography 
 G. C. Marras, Un poema sardo-ispano per suor Juana Inès de la Cruz, in AA. VV., G. C. Marras, (a cura di), Lingue, segni, identità nella Sardegna moderna, Rome, 2000 
  L. Spanu, Monografia di Giuseppe Zatrilla, Cagliari, 1992

History of Sardinia
Kingdom of Sardinia
People from Cagliari
Spanish-language writers from Sardinia
Spanish-language poets
Sardinian literature
1648 births
1720 deaths